Congressional prayer may refer to:

Prayer held before sessions of the U.S. Congress

See also 
Congressional Prayer Room
Congregational prayer (disambiguation)